Vaibhav Shrivastava, more popularly known as Vayu, is an Indian singer and songwriter, who has been active in the industry for over 10 years.
He signed on to Sony Music India as an exclusive artist in 2018.

Early life 
Vayu was born in Madhya Pradesh and spent his childhood years in small towns like Singrauli and Rewa. His mother used to affectionately call him Vayu, and the nickname stuck. His parents moved to Bhopal after he finished his schooling.

Vayu moved to Indore to study Graphic Designing and later shifted to Pune to pursue Masters in Mass Communication from Symbiosis Institute of Mass Communication (SIMC).

Career 
Vayu moved to Mumbai in 2009 and worked in advertising by writing for various mediums like print and TV. He finally got his first lyricist break by Ram Gopal Verma in the 2010 movie, Rann. With Oopar Oopar Renn De (Bro Anthem) in 2014 and Banno from Tanu Weds Manu Returns in 2015, he established his credentials as a quirky and hit lyricist, and found a name in the industry. Initially, Vayu started out in Bollywood with his friend Tanishk Bagchi, but the two have now gone separate solo ways, occasionally collaborating on a song or two.

Vayu wrote the lyrics for Arjun Kanungo's single Gallan Tipsiyaan and Akasa's single "Thug Ranjha".

Vayu has written and co-composed Sanedo from Mitron, 2018 (starring Jackky Bhagnani and Kritika Kamra). He has written the lyrics for Chad Gayi Hai and Monobina from the Akshay Kumar movie, Gold.

He has also written the lyrics for 3 songs (Milegi Milegi, Kamariya, Nazar Na Lag Jaaye) in the latest hit movie Stree, starring Rajkummar Rao and Shraddha Kapoor with Pankaj Tripathi, Aparshakti Khurrana, and Abhishek Banerjee appearing in supporting roles.

Badhaaiyan Tenu is a track written by Vayu, for the upcoming comedy drama film Badhaai Ho directed by Amit Ravindernath Sharma.

Vayu wrote the Pepsi Anthem Swag Se Solo and also composed it along with  Tanishk Bagchi.

He is a composer, lyricist and singer of a song under label of Sony Music India named as Baatein Karo. It was released in March 2020. Shot in India and Sri Lanka. A soulful track on smartphone life consuming the importance of in person talks.

Discography 
Vayu has contributed to several Bollywood movies as lyricist and performer. Following is his discography.

Awards and nominations

References

Year of birth missing (living people)
Living people
Indian composers
Indian film score composers
Hindi-language lyricists
Indian lyricists